Sir Kenneth William Murray Pickthorn, 1st Baronet, PC (23 April 1892 – 12 November 1975) was a British academic and politician.

The eldest son of Charles Wright Pickthorn, master mariner, and Edith Maud Berkeley Murray, he was educated at Aldenham School and at Trinity College, Cambridge.

In World War I he served with the 15th London Regiment and the Royal Air Force in France and Macedonia. He was appointed a Fellow of Corpus Christi College, Cambridge in 1914, serving as dean from 1919 to 1927 and a tutor from 1927 to 1935. He was president of the college from 1937 to 1944.

He served as Conservative Member of Parliament (MP) for Cambridge University from 1935 to 1950 and, on the abolition of university constituencies, for the Carlton Division of Nottinghamshire from 1950 to 1966. He served in government as Parliamentary Secretary to the Ministry of Education from 1951 until October 1954.

He was awarded the degree of LittD by Cambridge University in 1936, created a baronet in 1959 and appointed a Privy Counsellor in 1964.

Notes

References

External links 
 

1892 births
1975 deaths
British Army personnel of World War I
Royal Air Force personnel of World War I
Alumni of Trinity College, Cambridge
Baronets in the Baronetage of the United Kingdom
Conservative Party (UK) MPs for English constituencies
Fellows of Corpus Christi College, Cambridge
London Regiment officers
Members of the Privy Council of the United Kingdom
Members of the Parliament of the United Kingdom for the University of Cambridge
People educated at Aldenham School
Royal Air Force officers
UK MPs 1935–1945
UK MPs 1945–1950
UK MPs 1950–1951
UK MPs 1951–1955
UK MPs 1955–1959
UK MPs 1959–1964
UK MPs 1964–1966
Ministers in the third Churchill government, 1951–1955